Kophobelemnidae is a family of corals belonging to the order Pennatulacea.

Genera:
 Kophobelemnon Asbjørnsen, 1856
 Malacobelemnon Tixier-Durivault, 1965
 Sclerobelemnon Kölliker, 1872

References

Pennatulacea
Cnidarian families